"", Op. 410 ("Spring's Voices," or commonly "Voices of Spring"; sometimes sung in Italian as "Voci di primavera") is an orchestral waltz, with optional solo soprano voice, written in 1882 by Johann Strauss II.

History
Strauss dedicated the work to the pianist and composer Alfred Grünfeld. The famous coloratura soprano Bertha Schwarz (stage name Bianca Bianchi) sang this concert aria at a grand matinée charity performance at the Theater an der Wien in aid of the "Emperor Franz Joseph and Empress Elisabeth Foundation for Indigent Austro-Hungarian subjects in Leipzig". The waltz was not a great success at its premiere, but was more successful when performed on Strauss' tour of Russia in 1886. A piano arrangement by the composer contributed much to its success beyond Vienna.  Grünfeld, the work's dedicatee and a pianist and composer in his own right, also wrote and recorded his own concert transcription of the work for solo piano.

Bianca Bianchi was then a famous member of the Vienna Court Opera Theatre and Strauss was sufficiently inspired to compose a new work, a waltz for solo voice, for the acclaimed singer. The result was his world-renowned "Frühlingsstimmen" waltz which celebrated spring and remained one of the classical repertoire's most famous waltzes. The piece is sometimes used as an insertion aria in the act 2 ball scene of Strauss' operetta Die Fledermaus.

Music

The waltz makes a grand entry in the key of B-flat major with loud chords preceded with the waltz's three beats to the bar ushering the first waltz's gentle and swirling melody. The second waltz section, in E-flat major invokes the joys of spring with the flute imitating birdsong and a pastoral scene. The plaintive and dramatic third section in A-flat major and later in C minor probably suggests spring showers whereas the fourth section that follows breaks out from the pensive mood with another cheerful melody in A-flat major. Without a coda, the familiar first waltz melody makes a grand re-entry before its breathless finish, strong chords and the usual timpani drumroll and warm brass flourish. A performance lasts between seven and nine minutes.

Instrumentation

This is scored for 2 flutes, piccolo, 2 oboes, 2 clarinets, 2 bassoons, 2 trumpets, 3 trombones, timpani, cymbals, celesta, piano, and strings.

Lyrics
The lyrics were created by Richard Genée (1823–1895).

Frühlingsstimmen in popular culture
"Frühlingsstimmen" is probably best known today from its use by the American slapstick comedy team The Three Stooges in their short films Micro-Phonies and Brideless Groom. In the former short, it is sung by Christine McIntyre. The idea for using it probably came from her, as she had sung it in an earlier 'soundie' sing-a-long short in which she featured. The audience was encouraged to keep quiet when McIntyre was singing the 'Voices of Spring' number.
Musical films with the name Frühlingsstimmen were made in Austria in 1933 (with music by Oscar Straus) and in 1952 (with music by Alfred Uhl).
The waltz was choreographed as a ballet by Sir Frederick Ashton, under the name Voices of Spring.

References

External links
 
, sung by Kathleen Battle, conducted by Herbert von Karajan, 1987 Vienna New Year's Concert

Waltzes by Johann Strauss II
1882 compositions
Opera excerpts
Soprano arias
Compositions in B-flat major